The Secretary-General of the State Council is an executive position within the State Council of the People's Republic of China. It ranks below the Premier and above the Ministers of various ministries and departments. The equivalent position in other political systems is the cabinet secretary.

The current secretary general is Wu Zhenglong. The office holder is supported by a few Deputy Secretary-Generals of the State Council.

Role 
The Secretary-General is responsible for the day-to-day work of the State Council and is in charge of the State Council General Office. The office holder is supported by a few Deputy Secretary-Generals of the State Council.

List of Secretaries-General

References 

State Council of the People's Republic of China
Secretaries-general